Harizeh (also Romanized as Harīzeh and Herīzeh; also known as Harpazeh Jabal and Kūkī) is a village in Jabal Rural District, Kuhpayeh District, Isfahan County, Isfahan Province, Iran. At the 2006 census, its population was 106, in 52 families.

References 

Populated places in Isfahan County